Küçükcamili can refer to:

 Küçükcamili, Alaca
 Küçükcamili, Bala